James Holland Keet (born May 12, 1949), is an American restaurateur and politician in Little Rock, Arkansas, and a former member of the Arkansas House of Representatives and Arkansas Senate. Keet was the Republican nominee for governor of Arkansas in 2010, but lost the race in a landslide to incumbent Democrat Mike Beebe.

References

|-

|-

1944 births
Living people
American restaurateurs
Businesspeople from Florida
Florida Republicans
People from Gulf Breeze, Florida
Republican Party Arkansas state senators
Republican Party members of the Arkansas House of Representatives
Businesspeople from Little Rock, Arkansas
Politicians from Springfield, Missouri
Politicians from Little Rock, Arkansas
Candidates in the 2010 United States elections
Southern Methodist University alumni